FWS may refer to:

Government 
 Federal Wage System, a program of the United States Office of Personnel Management
 Federal Work-Study Program, of the United States Department of Education
 United States Fish and Wildlife Service, an agency of the United States Department of the Interior
 Frank-Walter Steinmeier, currently serving as the 12th Federal President of Germany

Other uses 
 Fetal warfarin syndrome
 Fort Worth Spinks Airport, in Texas, United States
 The Falcon and the Winter Soldier, a Disney+ miniseries
 United States Air Force Fighter Weapons School, now the United States Air Force Weapons School
 United States Navy Fighter Weapons School, now the United States Navy Strike Fighter Tactics Instructor program
 Vienna Airport railway station, in Austria

See also 
 FW (disambiguation)